Károly Molnár may refer to:
 Károly Molnár (academic)
 Károly Molnár (judoka)